South Tamworth is an unincorporated community in the town of Tamworth in Carroll County, New Hampshire, United States. It is located along New Hampshire Route 25, next to the Bearcamp River. Route 25 continues east past the village of Whittier to West Ossipee, where it intersects New Hampshire Route 16. To the west, Route 25 leads to Moultonborough, Center Harbor, and Meredith.

South Tamworth has a separate ZIP code (03883) from the rest of Tamworth.

References

Unincorporated communities in Carroll County, New Hampshire
Unincorporated communities in New Hampshire
Tamworth, New Hampshire